Choreographer George Balanchine's production of Tchaikovsky's 1892 ballet The Nutcracker has become the most famous stage production of the ballet performed in the U.S. (Mikhail Baryshnikov's production is the most famous television version, although it too originated onstage.) It uses the plot of the Alexandre Dumas, père, version of E.T.A. Hoffmann's tale, "The Nutcracker and the Mouse King" (1816). Its premiere took place on February 2, 1954, at City Center, New York, with costumes by Karinska and sets by Horace Armistead. It has been staged in New York every year since 1954, and many other productions throughout the United States either imitate it, or directly use the Balanchine staging. However, although it is often cited as being the production that made the ballet famous in the U.S., it was Willam Christensen's 1944 production for the San Francisco Ballet which first introduced the complete work to the United States.

Staging 
In Balanchine's version, the leading roles of Clara (here called Marie) and the Nutcracker/Prince are danced by children, and so their dances are choreographed to be less difficult than the ones performed by the adults. Marie does not dance at all in the second act of this version. The Prince's dancing in Act II is limited to the pantomime that he performs "describing" his defeat of the Mouse King. Instead, Marie and the Prince sit out nearly all of Act II watching other dancers perform for them, and unlike most other versions, neither one of them takes part in the ballet's Final Waltz.

Because Marie and the Nutcracker / Prince are played by children approximately ten years old in the Balanchine Nutcracker, no adult romantic interest between them is even implied, although Marie and Drosselmeyer's nephew, who looks exactly like the Prince, are clearly drawn to each other during the Christmas party. However, the 1958 Playhouse 90 telecast of the Balanchine Nutcracker, which changed Marie's name back to Clara and stated that the Prince was Drosselmeyer's nephew, had narrator June Lockhart saying at the end that "From that day on, Drosselmeyer's nephew is Clara's Prince and Clara is his Princess, and I need not tell you that they lived happily ever after." (But Drosselmeyer's nephew is there when the Nutcracker is broken during the Christmas party, so it is difficult to believe that he is the Nutcracker/ Prince, unless Marie dreams her fantasy adventures, and it is unclear in this version whether she does or not.) Years later, movie critic Stephen Holden, in reviewing the 1993 film version of the Balanchine Nutcracker, referred to Marie as the Prince's sweetheart. And oddly enough, throughout Act II of the 1993 film of Balanchine's version, Marie does wear a veil that resembles a bridal veil.

The Balanchine version uses perhaps more real children than any other version. (In other versions, the children are sometimes played by adult women.) The rôles of Clara and the Nutcracker/ Prince are performed by adults in many other versions, and in these productions of the ballet, there is usually more than a hint of budding romance between the two.

The Journey Through the Snow sequence, in many other productions danced by Clara and the Nutcracker immediately after his transformation into a Prince, is not danced at all in the Balanchine version, although the music is played. Instead, Marie faints and falls on the bed after the battle, and the Nutcracker exits. Marie's bed moves by itself across the stage as the music plays, and at its climax, the Nutcracker reappears and through the use of a stage effect, turns into a Prince. He awakens Marie, places on her head one of the crowns that he took from the dead seven-headed Mouse King, and they exit. (In the 1993 film of Balanchine's Nutcracker, the bed flies through the air rather than simply moving across the stage. This is achieved by visual effects created by Industrial Light & Magic.)

On the screen 

Balanchine's Nutcracker has since been staged in New York every year, filmed once, and performed live on television three times – although its first television edition, telecast by CBS in 1957 on the TV anthology The Seven Lively Arts, was severely abridged. Some sources say it was complete, but it could not have been because The Seven Lively Arts was only an hour long. This marked the first telecast not only of the Balanchine version but of any staging of the ballet. CBS's Playhouse 90 broadcast a more complete (but still abridged) version of the Balanchine Nutcracker, narrated by actress June Lockhart, who was then starring as the mother in CBS's Lassie, on Christmas Day in 1958; it was the first Nutcracker (and only installment of the entire Playhouse 90 series) broadcast in color. There were only four commercial breaks. This television production starred Balanchine himself as Drosselmeyer, Diana Adams as the Sugar Plum Fairy, Bonnie Bedelia in an early role as Clara, and Robert Maiorano as the Nutcracker/ Prince.

Excerpts from the Balanchine production were performed several times on various television shows of the time, notably The Bell Telephone Hour and The Ed Sullivan Show.

The complete Balanchine version was eventually made into a poorly received full-length feature film by Elektra Entertainment and Regency Enterprises. It was distributed and released by Warner Bros. Family Entertainment in 1993, and starred Macaulay Culkin in his only screen ballet rôle, as the Nutcracker, the Prince, and Drosselmeyer's nephew. The film was directed by Emile Ardolino, with narration spoken by Kevin Kline. From the billing in this film, the Prince and the nephew would seem to be two different characters, though that may not have been what the filmmakers intended. Director Ardolino died of AIDS only a few days before the film's release. The other rôles in the film were played by members of the New York City Ballet, including Darci Kistler as the Sugar Plum Fairy, Damian Woetzel as the Fairy's Cavalier, Bart Cook as Drosselmeyer, Jessica Lynn Cohen as Marie (a.k.a. Clara), and Wendy Whelan as Coffee in the Arabian Dance.

During the 2011 Christmas season, PBS, for the very first time, presented the complete Balanchine Nutcracker on Live from Lincoln Center, although it was not seen on all PBS affiliates, since the affiliates have a choice of which programs they will air locally. This was not the 1993 film, but the production's latest revival, and the production was telecast by PBS on December 14, 2011. This presentation, directed by Alan Skog, marked the first U.S. telecast of the Balanchine version (aside from cable and "on demand" showings of the 1993 theatrical film) in more than fifty years. It was nominated for an Emmy Award in July 2012.

Casts

Original 

   
 Zina Bethune (as Clara)
 Maria Tallchief (as the Sugar Plum Fairy)
 Tanaquil LeClercq (as Dewdrop)
 Alberta Grant (as Marie)
 Francisco Moncion (as Coffee)
 Robert Barnett (as Candy Cane)
 
 Nicholas Magallanes (as the Cavalier)
 Michael Arshansky (as Drosselmeyer)
 Paul Nickel (as the Nutcracker, the Prince, and Drosselmeyer's Nephew)

NYCB revivals

Television 
(1958)
  
 Bonnie Bedelia as Clara 
 Diana Adams (as the Sugar Plum Fairy)
 Arthur Mitchell (as Coffee)
 Edward Villella (as Candy Cane)
 Allegra Kent (as Dewdrop)

 George Balanchine as Drosselmeyer
 Robert Maiorano (as the Nutcracker, the Prince, and Drosselmeyer's Nephew)
(The Sugar Plum Fairy's Cavalier is not included in the current cast list)

Television 
(2011)
   
 Megan Fairchild (as the Sugar Plum Fairy)
 Teresa Reichlen (as Coffee)
 Daniel Ulbricht (as Candy Cane)
 Ashley Bouder (as Dewdrop)

 Joaquín De Luz (as the Cavalier)
 Colby Clark (as the Nutcracker, the Prince, and Drosselmeyer's Nephew)
 Fiona Brennan (as Marie)
 Adam Hendrickson (as Drosselmeyer)

Theatrical Film Version 
(1993)
   
 Darci Kistler (as the Sugar Plum Fairy)
 Kyra Nichols (as Dewdrop)
 Tom Gold (as Candy Cane)
 Margaret Tracey (as Marzipan Shepherdess)

 Damian Woetzel (as the Cavalier)
 Macaulay Culkin (as the Nutcracker, the Prince, and Drosselmeyer's Nephew)
 Jessica Lynn Cohen (as Marie)
 Bart Cook (as Drosselmeyer) (billed as Bart Robinson Cook)

Music 

Balanchine adds to Tchaikovsky's score an entr'acte that the composer wrote for Act II of The Sleeping Beauty, but which is now seldom played in productions of that ballet. In Balanchine's Nutcracker, it is used as a transition between the departure of the guests and the battle with the mice. During this transition, the mother of Marie (as she is usually called in this version) appears in the living room and throws a blanket over the girl, who has crept downstairs and fallen asleep on the sofa; then Drosselmeyer appears, repairs the Nutcracker, and binds the jaw with a handkerchief. In addition, the Dance Of The Sugar Plum Fairy is moved from near the end of Act II to near the beginning of the second act, just after the Sugar Plum Fairy makes her first appearance. To help the musical transition, the tarantella that comes before the dance is cut. In the 1993 film version of the Balanchine version, just as in the telecast of the Baryshnikov one, the Miniature Overture is cut in half, and the opening credits are seen as the overture is heard. The film's final credits feature a reprise of the Trepak and the Waltz of the Flowers.

Footnotes

External links 
George Balanchine’s The Nutcracker at the Balanchine Trust website

Balanchine
Ballets by George Balanchine
New York City Ballet repertory
Ballets designed by Barbara Karinska
Ballets designed by Rouben Ter-Arutunian
1954 ballet premieres